The term ‘hybrid institution’ is not yet well-established or clearly defined in academic literature. German and Keller possibly introduced the term in 2009, describing it as "an institutional arrangement governing the interdependencies among discrete property holders and regimes". Abbot and Faude have suggested more recently that most areas in world politics today are governed "neither by individual institutions nor by regime complexes composed of formal interstate institutions. Rather, they are governed by “hybrid institutional complexes” comprising heterogeneous interstate, infra-state, public–private and private transnational institutions, formal and informal." Whether they are anything more than euphemisms for public-private partnerships, which are nothing new, is yet to be firmly established.

Definition and origins

Definition
The term ‘institution’ eludes precise definition, and its interpretation in academic literature varies. The dictionary definition: ‘an established law, custom, or practice’ is an oft-used and useful starting point. Theoretical discussions have highlighted a distinction between formal (laws, official rules, contracts, standards, procedures) and informal (shared values, behavioural norms, belief systems, codes of conduct, discourses) institutions. This distinction has emerged from what has been termed the ‘new institutionalism’, which adopts a more critical approach to the study of institutions. Institutions are seen as key actors in guiding the political process, and are shaped by historical struggles, rules and procedures; rather than being merely the aggregation of individual motives. The apparent paradox at play here, that institutions both shape political processes and are themselves the product of political processes, is explored further in the examples below.

The ‘new institutionalism’ is of value in defining what constitutes a ‘hybrid institution’, as it demonstrates “a concern with new arrangements for policy-making rather than a new look at old institutions”. Lowdnes’ concept of the ‘disaggregated institution’ theorises the institutionalisation of relations between governmental and non-governmental actors, providing a useful starting point for conceptualising hybrid institutions. A hybrid institution is as an institution which exists between or across the boundaries of sectors, government departments, geographic units, or combines the governance regimes of “traditional dichotomies” such as the state and the market. They represent a new institutional pluralism, blurring the boundaries between previously distinct policy entities by creating new formal and informal institutions. A definition which includes both formal and informal institutions may be considered problematic in that almost any dialogue or cooperation could be considered an informal hybrid institution. North’s distinction between ‘loosely’ and ‘thickly’ institutionalised policy environments is of use here. Where cooperation is limited, and not enshrined within official documents or a specific policy or contract (loose, informal institutionalisation), the hybrid can be said to be weak. Within ‘thickly’ institutionalised environments, with contracts, rules, joint appointments etc. the hybrid is strong. This distinction is examined further in examples below. Depending on the specific context, a strong or weak hybridisation may determine the legitimacy of the institution.

Institutional theorists stress the need to distinguish between institutions and organisations. Organisations are defined as “purposive entities”, and are “tangible ‘things’”  which have remits, offices and staff”. Institutions on the other hand provide the rules, norms and settings within which organisations emerged. With hybrid institutions, such a distinction may be more difficult to draw, or perhaps not so necessary. If two existing organisations collaborate to form a joint department, bureau or agency, this new ‘tangible’ entity may meet the criteria of an organisation, but given its novelty and the specific conditions of its formation (being the result of an explicitly collaborative or ‘hybrid’ approach), it may be considered a hybrid institution. Treating ‘organisation’ and ‘institution’ synonymously is perhaps less problematic within the context of hybrid institutions.

While institutionalism relaxes the distinction between organizations and institutions, it is customary to see hybridity in terms of organisations. In practice, many hybrid arrangements exist on meso level as industries or organizational fields such as cleantech industry or innovations systems, as well as on system level (e.g. health policy). Further, in relational terms hybrids can be analysed in terms of single entities, dyads (group of two) or as triads (group of three). For instance global air travel consists of public, private and hybrid airline operators (single entity). The global airtravel is organized according to bilateral agreements (dyad) among public authorities, and global alliances consist of hybrid contracting among the partners in the alliances (triad)

Origins
Hybrid institutions, although rarely discussed explicitly in the literature, have existed since the 1980s. The quangos established under the Thatcher Government, for instance, represent state-market institutional hybrids. Quangos also serve to demonstrate the neoliberal context within which the changes in institutional configurations are taking place (the ‘rolling back’ of the state and a more prominent role for the market). Moreover, the Intergovernmental Panel on Climate Change and its predecessor the Advisory Group on Greenhouse Gases (considered below), hybrids operating between science and politics, were first established over two decades ago.

The term itself was coined by administrative economist Oliver Williamson. His original use of the term to analyse modes of governance in the private sector conflates nicely with ideas of hybrid governance more generally. Williamson explored hierarchal governance within the firm, and (self)governance of single transaction markets. Williamson’s examination of the efficacy of hybrid modes of governance which combine the responsiveness, efficiency and low transaction costs of markets with the administrative and cooperative capacity within the firm resembles state-market hybrids to some extent.

Type II Partnerships - An example of Public-Private Hybrid Institutions?
Type II Partnerships were developed at the Johannesburg World Summit on Sustainable Development in 2002. These partnerships exemplify a more general shift in governance practice that has been termed ‘The Partnership Movement’, whereby “transnational governance networks [...] bring together public, private and societal actors in an effort to institutionalise a set of ideas, practices, and norms” (emphasis added). There are clear links with network governance here, which studies the relationships between different (usually non-state) actors that work together on a particular issue or policy. The Type II Partnerships can be seen as an attempt to promote hybrid institutions between public and private actors. Whether or not these policy networks and partnerships were institutionalised, or were genuine hybrids, is debated within the literature. This debate provides a useful indirect critique of hybrid institutions.

Genuine Hybridity?
Although Type II Partnerships were conceived as public-private hybrids, the private sector is involved in just 20% of partnerships, and takes the lead in only 2%. Most partnerships are led by government agencies, NGOs, or existing international organisations, and the vast majority of funding comes from governments. Moreover, only 6% of partnerships involve actors from all the major categories set out: rich countries, poor countries, international organisations, NGOs, and industry. Thus, Type IIs should perhaps be considered state-non-state, rather than public-private hybrid institutions, if they can be considered hybrid institutions at all.

Can Hybrid Institutions Produce Significant Changes?
Because they develop out of existing institutional arrangements, hybrid institutions may be seen as reinforcing existing power structures, serving as a “reinvention of existing institutions”, which do not help address key institutional deficits in areas with the greatest need. This is another prominent criticism in literature on partnerships. Existing organisations seek legitimacy through successful initiatives and thus target areas which already enjoy a reasonable level of institutional capacity to boost their chances of success, meaning that weaker states and marginalised areas where the need for governance solutions is greatest are left out of the process. This is rather perverse for an initiative geared toward sustainable development.

The Need for Strong Hybrid Institutions
Although the partnerships have been criticised, a common criticism both of the Type IIs and multilateral policy more generally is the “minimal degree of institutionalisation” seen. This serves to promote strong hybrid institutions as a potential solution to the low “implementation record of [...] multilateral partnerships”. One of the more successful partnerships, The Andean Biotrade Programme, demonstrates both genuine hybridity and strongly institutionalised outcomes. The governments of 5 Andean countries, rich donor states, local and international organisations, research institutions and local communities all came together to form a Regional Biodiversity Strategy. The Strategy contains agreements on biotrade, technological development for conservation and eco-finance, a “set of intersected [issues] that have been deadlocked at the governmental level by competing interests and power inequalities”. In the context of the Type II Partnerships, strong hybrid institutionalisation is indicative of, indeed a “precondition” for success. By the same token, weak, informal institutionalism which demonstrates only “cosmetic or symbolic” arrangements does not bear positive results.

Accountability
Strong institutionalisation of partnerships in the form of monitoring procedures or implementation reviews, as well as helping ensure positive outcomes (legitimacy), also helps address a key requirement for institutions, accountability. New hybrid forms of governance make achieving accountability more difficult. Traditionally, (democratic) states are accountable to their voters, and private organisations to their members and shareholders. However, when numerous organisations act together, the picture is more complex. States are still ultimately acting on behalf of their citizens, but when acting in tandem with other sectors, or at the global level, the traditional “lines of accountability” lengthen. Moreover, there is often ‘external’ accountability as well as internal, in that actors are accountable to the people in areas they affect as well as their own constituents and members. By having clear and transparent strategies, policy documents, and reporting procedures, hybrid institutions can ensure their legitimacy and accountability.

Bridging science and politics
The Intergovernmental Panel on Climate Change is both a scientific and a political institution. It consists of over 2000 scientists representing 154 countries, and was “conceived as an explicitly hybrid institution capable of producing a political consensus around scientific knowledge concerning the global climate” (emphasis added). Its success in establishing political consensus over a very complex issue, and the failings of its predecessor, the Advisory Group on Greenhouse Gases, again serve as a useful indication of the principles for success in hybrid institutions.

In its present form, the Intergovernmental Panel on Climate Change is in many ways an exemplar hybrid institution. The institutional set-up is designed to achieve consensus and buy-in on a very complex issue. Each chapter must have a lead author from both the global north and south, to help ensure the report reflects the perspectives of both developed and developing countries. The final report must be unanimously agreed upon by both scientists and government representatives, resulting in a document which is “policy relevant but not policy prescriptive”. As with the partnerships discussed previously, the importance of achieving both a balance of input from different sectors, and rules which shape outcomes is evident; demonstrating need for strong, genuinely hybrid institutions.

Equally, some of the failings of the Intergovernmental Panel on Climate Change in its early forms, and its predecessor, demonstrate the failings of imbalanced hybrids. The quota rule which requires both north and south inputs for each chapter was introduced in response to criticism that the reports were western-centric. Moreover, Advisory Group on Greenhouse Gases failed because it was too far removed from policy-making process. Without sufficient dialogue with policy-makers, the Advisory Group was viewed with suspicion for its lack of transparency and openness. In this instance the Group failed to balance between scientific and political process and thus failed as a hybrid.

Some critics have argued that the Intergovernmental Panel on Climate Change produces ‘watered-down’ recommendations, because of the extent of political consultation. However, as illustrated, the political dialogue is necessary and has seen remarkable success in establishing consensus. A further criticism is that the formation of the Intergovernmental Panel on Climate Change was shaped by a northern political agenda, and by framing climate change in terms of ‘tolerable levels’, the moral and political issues over differential historical uses of the world’s resources were avoided. This argument reflects a wider critique of institutions as being the product of traditional power structures that perpetuate existing inequalities. Solutions that rest on hybrid institutions would be rejected by scholars such as Jordan & O’Riordan who argue for a “universal shift” in the institutional arrangements for tackling climate change, as they serve to promote western interests at the expense of the developing world at present.

The designing of Dolly - A clone and a hybrid?
Dolly the sheep was born on 7 February 1997 as the first animal cloned from adult cells. The institutional arrangements behind this scientific feat demonstrate the increasing “embeddedness” of political, scientific, and economic processes at work in the production of knowledge. Dolly was a product of three intimately linked institutions: The Roslin Research Institute (government funded), PPL Therapeutics (private firm), and Edinburgh University. Formally, these are all separate entities, but in reality they are intertwined and should be considered hybrid institutions. PPL, whose involvement in funding the Dolly project was driven by potential commercial applications, was originally a ‘spin-off’ from the Roslin Institute. The Roslin institute was initially formed to take advantage of the strong biomedical department at Edinburgh University, and over 50 PhD students from the University were involved in the Dolly project. Such hybrid arrangements are increasingly important, “the hybridity that these institutes represent” subverts views of a linear relationship between science and policy and demonstrates the required “intellectual pluralism and flexibility” in public science systems . Again, the neoliberal context is evident here, with state-funded entities having to engage with the private sector and demonstrate economic worthiness to maintain legitimacy.

Between Stockholm and Lima
In previous examples, successful institutions are defined by strong hybridity. However, hybridity which is too strong can challenge the legitimacy of academic-scientific-private hybrids. Gulbrandsen highlights the dilemma faced by Research Institutions in their engagement with the private sector and universities. Stockholm syndrome, whereby hostages develop loyalty to their captors, is used to describe a scenario where the need for private funding jeopardises the neutrality of the research process in favour of a particular clients’ perspective. Lima syndrome, whereby the captors develop an attachment to their hostages, applies where research bodies lose sight of their role in contributing to society and becoming preoccupied with esoteric academic debates. This example shows that an implied relationship between success and strong hybridity does not apply in all contexts. Indeed, weak and informally institutionalised hybrids may be necessary to retain legitimacy in some cases.

Hybrid institutions and resource governance
One of the few uses of the term hybrid institutions in academic literature which relates explicitly to governance is German & Keeler’s discussion of hybridising governance of property regimes. Ostrom’s theory of common pool resource management highlights the value of community-created institutions in the governing of a common resource (communication, rule-making, sanctions, conflict resolution etc.). German & Keeler’s proposal is to extrapolate these successful principles and apply them across “diverse property regimes”, for state-owned, private and communal resources, creating hybrid institutions that combine usually distinct governance regimes. The proposal is that the
combining technical and enforcement capacity of the state, the legal certainty of ownership, and the successful principles of self-organisation may help govern responses where property regimes are contentious or overlap, or where issues exist that do not respect discrete regimes of resource tenure (for example pests, weeds, or watercourse pollution).
This proposal argues for hybridity not between two sectors or organisations, but between previously distinct institutional configurations associated with separate modes of governance:

"[T]he functioning of [these] hybrid institutions depends upon the creative combination of autonomous (market), self-organising (contractual) and state regulatory (hierarchical) approaches to governance”  (emphasis added)

A hybrid future
As outlined previously, hybrid institutions are becoming more prominent amid moves away from traditional government towards modes of governance more appropriate for complex issues. For instance, a great deal of political faith is being placed on hybrid institutions for tackling climate change in the form of carbon markets. Carbon markets are very much hybrid institutions in that they rely on governments to set the “rules for participation”, such as setting the cap or baseline, monitoring, verification and, as seen in the recently announced Australian carbon tax, setting a minimum price for carbon. Only once carbon markets have been “crafted”  by political decisions does the market aspect enter into play. The complexity and hybridity of the institutional set-up of carbon markers will be further increased if proposals to link carbon markets from different regions of the world come to fruition.

Another proposal concerns the creation of a new, hybrid institution to better manage the overlaps between the UN Climate Regime and the World Trade Organization in areas such as border taxes on environmentally damaging goods, transfer of clean technologies, and trade liberalisation; institutionalising joint consideration of climate change and development. Currently these issues are addressed by the World Trade Organization's Committee on Trade and Environment, however there are questions as to whether this is sufficient. Even the Intergovernmental Panel on Climate Change, which avoids prescriptive policy advice, has questioned whether the Committee on Trade and Environment is “an appropriate forum” for such discussions.

Hybrid institutions then, have the potential to “bring together expertise, [...] and broaden dialogues to overcome negotiation deadlocks”. Legitimacy and accountability of these relatively novel arrangements rests upon establishing the right degree of institutionalisation and balanced hybridity, both of which vary within different contexts.

References

Political philosophy